Gerolamo Giovenone (1486/1487 – 1555), also spelled Girolamo, was an Italian painter of the early Renaissance period, active mainly in Milan. He was born in Vercelli. He was the teacher of the painter Gaudenzio Ferrari and possibly also taught il Sodoma. In Milan, he painted the Resurrection for the church of the Augustines. An altarpiece fragment depicting an Adoration of the Virgin and Child by Saints Nicola da Tolentino and Eusebius is displayed by the Museo Borgogna in Vercelli. A Virgin and Child with Saints is found at the National Gallery in London. Another of his pupils was Franchino Ferrari, born 1484 in Valduggia, and active in Vercelli. His works also include the Buronzo Altarpiece.

References

External links

 Getty museum entry
Artcyclopedia entry

1480s births
1555 deaths
People from Vercelli
15th-century Italian painters
Italian male painters
16th-century Italian painters
Painters from Milan
Italian Renaissance painters